The Chinese Exclusion Repeal Act of 1943, also known as the Magnuson Act, was an immigration law proposed by U.S. Representative (later Senator) Warren G. Magnuson of Washington and signed into law on December 17, 1943, in the United States. It allowed Chinese immigration for the first time since the Chinese Exclusion Act of 1882, and permitted some Chinese immigrants already residing in the country to become naturalized citizens. However, in many states, Chinese Americans (mostly immigrants but sometimes U.S. citizens) were denied property-ownership rights either by law or de facto until the Magnuson Act itself was fully repealed in 1965.

This act is the first legislation since 1870 which relaxed racial and national immigration barriers in the United States and started the way to the completely non-racial immigration legislation and policy of the late 1960s.

The Magnuson Act was passed on December 17, 1943, two years after the Republic of China became an official allied nation of the United States in World War II. Although considered a positive development by many, it was still restrictive, limiting Chinese immigrants to an annual quota of 105 new entry visas. The quota was determined according to the National Origins Formula prescribed by the Immigration Act of 1924, which set immigration quotas on countries subject to the law as a fraction of 150,000 in proportion to the number of inhabitants of that nationality residing in the United States as of the 1920 census, which for China was determined to be 0.07%, or 105 per annum. Chinese immigration later increased with the passage of the Immigration and Nationality Act of 1952, which abolished direct racial barriers and later by the Immigration and Nationality Act of 1965, which abolished the National Origins Formula.

References

1943 in American law
United States federal immigration and nationality legislation
History of immigration to the United States
Chinese-American history
1943 in international relations
Anti-Chinese legislation
China–United States relations
December 1943 events